Koji Sato or Kōji Satō may refer to:
 Koji Sato (actor) in live adaptation of Dive!!
Kōji Satō (photographer) (1911–1955), Japanese photographer
, Japanese politician
Koji Sato, Toyota CEO (April 2023 - present)